Down to Earth (subtitled The Ramsey Lewis Trio Plays Music from the Soil) is the fourth album by American jazz pianist Ramsey Lewis, recorded in 1958 and released on the EmArcy label.

Reception

AllMusic stated: "The music (if not essential) is quite accessible while still being jazz oriented. Worth picking up".

Track listing
 "Dark Eyes" (Traditional) - 2:28   
 "Come Back to Sorrento" (Traditional) - 3:10   
 "Soul Mist" (Ramsey Lewis) - 3:00   
 "John Henry" (Traditional) - 2:26   
 "Greensleeves" (Traditional) - 4:25   
 "We Blue It" (Eldee Young, Ramsey Lewis, Red Holt) - 5:01   
 "Sometimes I Feel Like a Motherless Child" (Traditional) - 2:10   
 "Suzanne" (Traditional) - 3:15   
 "Billy Boy" (Traditional) - 2:37   
 "Decisions" (Eldee Young) - 2:06

Personnel 
Ramsey Lewis - piano
El Dee Young - bass
Issac "Red" Holt - drums

References 

1959 albums
Ramsey Lewis albums
EmArcy Records albums